Ostend–Bruges International Airport , commonly known simply as Ostend Airport, is an international airport located  south southwest of Ostend, West Flanders in the Flemish Region of Belgium, near the coast and about  from the city centre of Bruges. Although freight transport is the focus of a large proportion of its activities, the airport is increasingly used for passenger flights, mainly charter and holiday flights organised by tour operators. It is also often used for private business flights.

History

During the Second World War, the Luftwaffe moved the airfield of Ostend-Stene to a site in the territory of the municipality of Middelkerke, five kilometres southwest of Ostend. It played a major role in the air battle with Britain. After the war, the airport of Raversijde-Middelkerke was turned into an international airport by the Department of Airways which had been established by that time.

In 1992, the ownership of the regional Flemish airport was transferred from the Belgian State to the Flemish Region. The airport was given a new name: "Ostend–Bruges International Airport".

On 23 May 2003, Mr. Gino Vanspauwen was appointed CEO/Managing Director of Ostend–Bruges International Airport by the Flemish government. He effectively took up his duties on 1 June 2003. The airport was operated by the Department of Mobility and Public Works of the Flemish government. The Flemish Government made an agreement with Egis Group to operate it starting 2014 for a duration of 25 years. Between May and December 2003, Ryanair operated a route between Ostend and London-Stansted.

For 2015, Jetairfly began service to a number of new destinations from Ostend. In the summer season of 2015, Jetairfly operated services to a total 20 destinations. As of summer 2017, these services are operated under the new name of TUI fly Belgium, with 21 destinations.

Airlines and destinations

Passenger

The following airlines operate regular scheduled and seasonal flights at Ostend–Bruges International Airport:

Cargo

Statistics

Ground transportation

By car 
The airport is located next to the N318 and N341 national roads.

By bus 
Bus 6 connects the airport to Ostend's city centre as well as Ostend railway station which operates intercity trains to Antwerp, Brussels and Liege. The bus is operated by De Lijn.

Accidents and incidents
On 16 November 1937, a Junkers Ju 52/3m of the Belgian airline Sabena crashed on approach due to bad weather. The aircraft flew against a chimney of a brickyard in Stene. All 11 passengers and crew, including Georg Donatus and his family, were killed.
On 21 July 1992, Douglas DC-3C LX-DKT of Legend Air was damaged beyond repair when it was blown into Boeing 707 Z-WKV during a storm. As of 28 July 2010, the aircraft was still at the airport.
 On 26 July 1997 during an airshow taking place at the airport, a Jordanian stunt pilot, Captain Omar Hani Bilal of the Royal Jordanian Air Force display team, the Royal Jordanian Falcons, was killed when he lost control of his Walter Extra EA300s. His plane crashed at the end of the runway and burst into flames near a Red Cross tent and spectator stands. On the ground, eight were killed and forty injured.
 November 14: An IAT Boeing 707 took off from Oostende Airport but crashed into the ground within a few minutes. It was a cargo flight and there were no deaths. 
On 18 April 2001, an Ilyushin Il-76 overran the runway after an aborted take-off. The aircraft got stuck in the grass and hit the ground with the left wing. The plane would never fly again and was scrapped 2 years later at the airport.

See also
 Transport in Belgium

References

Notes

External links

 Official website

Airports in West Flanders
Buildings and structures in Bruges
Ostend